Ville-ès-Nouaux is a Neolithic site, located in the parish of Saint Helier on the island of Jersey. It consists of a gallery tomb and a dolmen surrounded by a stone circle.

The complex dates back to the late Neolithic period (2800–2000 BC). The gallery tomb, with the entrance facing south, is 5.8 meters long. Inside, ceramic vessels were found, including goblets and bowls, as well as an archery plate. Dolmen is surrounded by a stone circle measuring 6.4 × 5.8 m and consists of a small chamber measuring 1.2 × 1 m and only 0.3 m high, covered with a stone slab supported by four load-bearing boulders. During the archaeological excavations carried out in 1883, only a few flint chips were found inside the dolmen.

References

Dolmens
Stone circles
Archaeological sites in Jersey
Saint Helier
Megalithic monuments in Europe
Neolithic sites of Europe